Vision Tech Camps is a Bay Area company offering summer computer camps and after-school activities, teaching students between the ages of 7-17 at Vision Tech centers and local schools throughout the Bay Area.

History 

Vision Tech Camps was founded in San Ramon, California by Anita Khurana in 2000, where after school programs and tech camps were initially offered to schools at schools within the San Ramon Valley Unified School District. Vision Tech later opened its first center in Danville, California, and expanded to another center in Saratoga, California in 2014. In 2017, Vision Tech Camps announced a new location in El Cerrito, California serving the Berkeley area.

Courses 

Vision Tech courses include video game design, programming, engineering, robotics, minecraft camps and 3d printing.

References

External links
https://www.visiontechcamps.com

Summer schools
Summer camps in California
2000 establishments in California
Companies based in Danville, California